There is no area code in Kuwait. As of 17 October 2008, telephone numbers in Kuwait consist of eight digits (with the exception of '800'-style numbers, which are made up of seven digits). From 17 October 2008 a single digit prefix was added to all fixed and mobile numbers as per the Ministry of Communication's new numbering plan:

 Number 1 was added before all commercial 6 digit numbers (e.g. 800000, 899999, etc.)
 Number 2 was added before all landline numbers
 Number 41 was allocated for Virgin Mobile numbers (year 2022) 
 Number 5 was added before all STC numbers
 Number 6 was added before all Ooredoo Telecom - Formerly Wataniya Telecom numbers
 Number 9 was added before all Zain numbers
 All the three digit lines remained the same without any additional number e.g. 121, 107, 113, 112, etc.

On June 15, 2013 the Kuwait's Ministry of Communications (MoC) has announced the launch of mobile number portability (MNP), a service that allows mobile users to change their service provider without the need to change their mobile number.

Here are the starting codes of landlines sorted by each area or city:

References

ITU allocation list
Kuwait listing 
Kuwait Mobile Number Database

Kuwait
Telecommunications in Kuwait
Kuwait communications-related lists